The Sensational Sherri Memorial Cup Tournament was an annual professional wrestling memorial event produced by the Association de Lutte Féminine (ALF) promotion, which was held in 2007 and 2008. The first tournament took place on October 12, 2007 at the Centre Sportif St-Barthélemy in Montreal, Quebec. It was the first event under the Amazones et Titans chronology and first-ever mixed tag team tournament held in the promotion's history. The show was held in honor of American female professional wrestler and manager "Sensational" Sherri Martel who died of an accidental drug overdose at the home of her mother in McCalla, Alabama four months earlier. Eight professional wrestling matches were featured on the event's card, including a battle royal.

LuFisto and El Generico won the tournament by winning two matches at the one-night tournament, receiving a bye for the semi-finals. Over the course of the evening, they defeated Misty Haven and Michael Von Payton in the opening rounds, and Stefany Sinclair and Kevin Steen in the final match. Steen, upset by their loss, attempted to steal the trophy and give it to Stefany, but was convinced by Stefany to return it to the rightful winners of the tournament. In addition to the tournament, a 7-woman battle royal was held which saw Kalamity defeat six other participants by last eliminating Mary Lollypop. As a result of a pre-match stipulation, Kalamity was declared the number one contender for the AWF championship earning a match against then champion Stefany Sinclair the following month.

The second tournament was held at Montreal's Centre Sportif St-Barthélemy on November 14, 2008, and won by Misty Haven and Michael Von Payton. They defeated three teams to win the event; Charlotte Lamothe and Jimmy Stone in the opening rounds, Mary Lollypop and Nova Cain in the semi-finals, and Kacey Diamond and Marko Estrada in the finals. Also featured on the undercard was a singles match between Vanessa Kraven and She Nay Nay, which Kraven won, and a non-tournament tag team match which saw Charlotte Lamothe and Karen Brooks defeat Eve and Anna Minoushka.

Show results

First Annual Sensational Sherri Memorial Cup Tournament
October 12, 2007 in Montreal, Quebec (Centre Sportif St-Barthélemy)

Tournament brackets
This was a one-night tournament which took place on October 15, 2007. The tournament brackets were:

Second Annual Sensational Sherri Memorial Cup Tournament
November 14, 2008 in Montreal, Quebec (Centre Sportif St-Barthélemy)

Tournament brackets
This was a one-night tournament which took place on November 14, 2008. The tournament brackets were:

References

External links

Amazones et Titans at FLQALF.com 
Amazones et Titans at FLQALF.com 

Professional wrestling memorial shows
2007 in professional wrestling
2008 in professional wrestling
Professional wrestling shows in Montreal
Tag team tournaments